Atlético Portuario was a Honduran football club based in Puerto Cortés, Honduras which played in the Liga Nacional in the 1979–80 season.

Achievements
Segunda División
Winners (1): 1978–79

League performance

All-time scorers

Defunct football clubs in Honduras